Buzoulyk (Bıźawlıq) is a rural locality (a village) in Udryakbashevsky Selsoviet, Blagovarsky District, Bashkortostan, Russia. The population was 84 as of 2010. There is 1 street.

Geography 
Buzoulyk is located 26 km southwest of Yazykovo (the district's administrative centre) by road. Tallykul is the nearest rural locality.

References 

Rural localities in Blagovarsky District